A B M Shawkat Ali is a Bangladeshi origin-Australian author, computer scientist and data analyst. He author of several books in the area of Data Mining, Computational Intelligence, and Smart Grid. He is a newspaper columnist. He is an academic and well-known researcher in the areas of Machine Learning and Data Science. He is also the founder of a research center and international conferences in Data Science and Engineering. He is now an Adjunct Professor in Data Science in the School of Engineering and Technology, Central Queensland University, Australia.

Early life and education 
Ali was born (July 30, 1969) just before the independent date of Bangladesh in Rajapur, Jamalpur. His parents Md. Saifuddin Sarker was a farmer and businessman and Mrs. Soufia Khatun was a housewife. Ali has two brothers and three sisters. He completed year five Primary education with regional first position from Rajapur Primary School in 1978, Secondary School Certificate (SSC) in 1984 securing First Division from Bahruakhali M N A High School, Jamalpur, Higher Secondary Certificate (HSC) in 1984 also securing First Division from Nasirabad College, Mymenshing in 1986. Then he got admission to study Electronics and Applied Physics Engineering Honours degree in The University of Rajshahi by obtaining the number one position in the admission within the Faculty of Science.

In Master's Examination (1991) from Rajshahi University, he obtained the second position with first class by breaking the 12 years record marks from the project group and was awarded a National Ministry of Science (NST) scholarship to study Master of Philosophy (MPhil) in computer science and engineering from the same university.

Professional memberships 
a. Senior Member, The Institute of Electrical and Electronics Engineers (IEEE), USA 

b. Member, IEEE Computer Society, IEEE Industrial Electronics Society, IEEE Big Data Community, IEEE Cloud Computing Community, IEEE Cloud Computing Community, IEEE Systems, Man, and Cybernetics Society

c. Member, Machine Intelligence Research Labs, USA 

d. Member, Victorian Chamber of Commerce and Industry, Australia

Professional career 
Ali started his professional career by teaching as a lecturer in the Department of Computer Science and Engineering, Islamic University, Bangladesh in Kushtia in 1997. Then he was promoted as an Assistant Professor in the same university in 1999. In 2001, Ali received the International Post Graduation Scholarship to pursue his PhD research at Monash University, Melbourne, Australia in Information Technology with a major Statistical Learning Theory under Machine Learning.  In the same year, Ali joined Gippsland School of Information Technology (GSIT), Monash University as an Assistant Lecturer. After submitting his PhD Thesis, he joined immediately as a Lead Lecturer in Data Mining at Central Queensland University in 2005. In 2006 Ali moved to Central Queensland University's main campus at Rockhampton, Queensland, Australia, and he was promoted as a Senior Lecturer in the School of Computer Science in 2008. In 2007 he became an author of book writing and his book is using over the 40 universities around the world as a text. Again, Ali moved to the School of Engineering and Technology in 2013 at the same university. He worked as a Visiting Professor under Consumer Purchasing Behaviour Monitoring in 2013 at the School of Business, Kansai University, Japan. In 2014 Ali moved to a South Pacific country – Fiji and joined as a Professor in Computer Science under the Department of Computer Science and Information Technology, The University of Fiji and appointed as a Head of Department. At the end of 2014, he resigned from head of department position and joined as an executive dean for the School of Science and Technology at the same university. In 2017, he joined as a visiting faculty for MBA program at The University of the South Pacific. Ali served as an academic consultant to Fiji National University to establish post-grad (Post Grad Diploma, Master's, and PhD) programs in 2018. Then he moved to Central Queensland University in 2019 as an Adjunct Professor in Data Science.

Awards 
a. Vice-Chancellor's Research Excellence Award, The University of Fiji, 2014.

b. Outstanding Leadership Award, 12th IEEE International Conference on Trust, Security and Privacy in Computing and Communications, 2013.

c. Excellence in Supervision Award, Central Queensland University, Australia, 2007.

d. Monash University Publication Awards, 2004.

Media interviews 

 Instacharge App, The Guardian Interview, 2016 
 Interview with IEEE, 2015 
 CQ University News, 2013 
 Interview with Australian Broadcasting Corporation (ABC), 2013
 Interview with IEEE, 2012

Founder and international community services 
Ali established a research and training centre in Fiji and he is the founder of two international conferences in Information Technology and Engineering.

a. Centre for Smart Technology, Fiji 

b. IEEE Asia-Pacific Conference on Computer Science and Data Engineering (IEEE CSDE) 

c. International Conference on Sustainable Technology and Engineering (i-COSTE) 

Ali served widely international community

a. IEEE Student Counsellor, 2008–2010.

b. Fiji government delegate to The United Nations Climate Change Conference, COP20 in Lima, Peru, from December 1 to 12, 2014.

c. Program advisor to The University of Alicante, Spain and The University of Papua New Guinea, PNG, 2016.

d. UniFiji delegate to The Commonwealth Education Ministers Conference, 2018.

e. ICISET 2016, International Advisor, Bangladesh, 2016.

Ali is a well-known international keynote speaker

a. Statistical learning Theory, Rajshahi University, Bangladesh, 2019 

b. Machine Learning, Rajshahi University, Bangladesh, 2018 

c. Big Data: Changing the way of our businesses, Kansai University, Japan, 2016 

d. Quantum Computing, International Colloquium on Advanced Convergence Engineering, KMOU, South Korea, 2018.

e. International conference on Bioinformatics and Biostatistics for Agriculture, Rajshahi University, Bangladesh, 2017.

f.  Current Research Trends in ICT, Islamic University, Bangladesh, 2017.

Ali led few international conferences as a General Chair

a. General Chair: The Australasian Universities Power Engineering Conference (AUPEC 2019), Mariott Resort, Fiji, 26-29th Nov. 2019.

b. General Chair: 10th International Conference Internet and Distributed Computing System (IDCS 2017) in Mana Island, Fiji on 12–14 December 2017.

c. General Chair: The 16th IEEE International Conference on Computer and Information Technology (CIT-2016), 8–10 December, Shangri-La's Fijian Resort and Spa – Yanuca Island, Fiji.

d. General Chair: The 2nd International Symposium on Security and Privacy in Social Networks and Big Data (SocialSec 2016), 8–10 December, Shangri-La's Fijian Resort and Spa – Yanuca Island, Fiji.

e. General Chair: The 3rd International Conference on Internet of Vehicles (IOV 2016), 8–10 December, Shangri-La's Fijian Resort and Spa – Yanuca Island, Fiji.

f.  General Chair: The Sixth IEEE International Symposium on Cloud and Services Computing (SC2 2016), Shangri-La's Fijian Resort and Spa – Yanuca Island, Fiji.

g. General Chair: The 10th International Conference on Green, Pervasive and Cloud Computing (GPC 2015) held in Plantation Island, Fiji, 4–6 May 2015.

Publications 
Ali have published books, book chapters, research papers and newspaper articles over 150, all his research publications have appeared in peer-reviewed journals and conference proceedings.

Books

a. Internet and Distributed Computing Systems, Springer, 2018, .

b. Internet of Vehicles – Technologies and Services, Springer, 2017, .

c. Internet and Distributed Computing Systems, Springer, 2016, .

d. Energy Storage for Power Utility, LAP LAMBERT Academic Publishing, Germany, 2014, ISBN .

e. Computational Intelligence for Decision Support in Cyber Physical Systems, Springer, 2014, .

f.  Smart Grids: Opportunities, Developments, and Trends, Springer-Verlag London, 2013, .

g. Multidisciplinary Computational Intelligence Techniques: Applications in Business, Engineering and Medicine, IGI Global, USA, 2012, .

h. Dynamic and Advanced Data Mining for Progressing Technological Development: Innovations and Systemic Approaches, IGI Global, USA, 2010, .

i.  Data Mining: Methods and Techniques. Thomson, Australia. 2007. .

Newspaper articles

a. Golden Opportunity For Sports Institute 

b. FOCUS: Cloud Computing – Time To Get In 

c. FOCUS: Golap Banu Story With A Fijian Lesson

References

External links 
For publication details: 

Living people
1969 births
University of Rajshahi alumni
Monash University alumni
Academic staff of the Islamic University, Bangladesh
Academic staff of the University of Fiji
Bangladeshi writers
Bangladeshi computer scientists
People from Jamalpur District
Academic staff of Central Queensland University
Academic staff of Kansai University